The Rise and Fall of Butch Walker and the Let's-Go-Out-Tonites  is the third full-length solo album by Butch Walker, released on July 11, 2006 on Epic Records. The album's title is a reference to the David Bowie album The Rise and Fall of Ziggy Stardust and the Spiders from Mars. The album's lead single was "Bethamphetamine (Pretty, Pretty)". The video for the single featured Avril Lavigne in a starring role and was inspired in the story of Christiane F. Those who preordered the album from select outlets were given the bonus track "New York Minute" in mp3 format.

Track listing
All songs were written by Butch Walker.

Personnel 
Butch Walker – vocals, additional guitars, additional bass, piano, organ, percussion
Michael Guy Chislett – guitar, keyboards, claps, backing vocals
Darren Dodd – drums, percussion, backing vocals, claps
Randy Michael – acoustic guitars
Wes Flowers – Hammond organ, keys
James Hall – backing vocals, piano, trumpet, harmonica
Dr. Brad Goron – horn section
Page Waldrop – pedal steel
Yvette Petit – backing vocals
Alecia "Pink" Moore – guest vocals on "Song Without a Chorus"

2006 albums
Butch Walker albums
Albums produced by Butch Walker
Epic Records albums